Steve Treviño is an American stand-up comedian, writer, and producer. He has released three stand-up specials, the first of which was filmed for Showtime, the second released on Netflix, and the third is now available on Amazon Prime Video. He also worked as a writer for Carlos Mencia's Comedy Central show, Mind of Mencia and Pitbull's La Esquina.

Early life

Treviño was born and grew up in Portland, Texas and its surrounding area. He comes from a Mexican-American family.

Career

Treviño began his comedy career at age 19 in 1997 often working the Addison Improv comedy club in Addison, Texas. He would also volunteer to take the club's headlining comedians to promotional radio interviews.

One of Treviño's first major gigs also came at age 19 when he opened for Carlos Mencia. In 2005 and 2006, he wrote for and occasionally performed in Mencia's television show, Mind of Mencia.

In 2008 he went on to write and produce for Pitbull's mun2 show, La Esquina. He also made stand-up comedy appearances on The Late Late Show with Craig Ferguson, Comics Unleashed, and ComicView.
 
In 2011, Treviño appeared on Marc Maron's podcast, WTF with Marc Maron, where he criticized Carlos Mencia for his documented joke theft and history of bumping other comedians.

In 2012, Treviño released his first stand-up special for Showtime called Steve Treviño: Grandpa Joe's Son.

His second special, Steve Treviño: Relatable, aired on NuvoTV in February 2014 and began streaming on Netflix later that year. The special was recorded at the American Bank Center in Corpus Christi.

In October 2017, Treviño began working on producing a third stand-up special called Steve Treviño: 'Til Death which was released in January 2019 and is now streaming on Amazon Amazon Prime Video.

In June 2020, Steve partnered with his wife Renae "Captain Evil" Treviño and launched a podcast featuring the two discussing their marriage, family, and their overall life as the Treviño's. Steve Treviño & Captain Evil: The Podcast officially launched on June 3, 2020, during the coronavirus pandemic, and airs episodes weekly on Facebook, YouTube, and other Podcast distributors.

During the 2020 Coronavirus pandemic, Steve worked on, filmed, and released his fourth stand-up special called Steve Treviño: My Life in quarantine which was filmed in front of a live, socially distanced, masked audience and released on October 15, 2020 through On Location Live. The special includes new stand-up comedy from Steve along with an episode of the Steve Treviño & Captain Evil: The Podcast filmed in front of the live audience. In addition, there are special appearances from family members including his son Garrett, his mom "Miss Dora," as well as his father-in-law, "Daddy Raymond."

Filmography

Television

Discography
 Steve Treviño: That's How Daddy Does It (2005)
 Steve Treviño: Live (2010)
 Steve Treviño: Grandpa Joe's Son (2012)
 Steve Treviño: 'Til Death (2019)

Podcast
 Steve Treviño & Captain Evil: The Podcast (2020)

References

External links
 

1978 births
Living people
American male comedians
American people of Mexican descent
Comedians from Texas
People from Corpus Christi, Texas